Appomattox Station was located in the town of Appomattox, Virginia (at the time, known as, West Appomattox) and was the site of the Battle of Appomattox Station on the day before General Robert E. Lee surrendered the Army of Northern Virginia to Lieutenant General Ulysses S. Grant, effectively ending the Civil War. That station was destroyed by fire in 1898 and its replacement by fire in 1923. The current railway station, built within a block of the original location, is the Appomattox Depot (1923), a contributing property to the Appomattox Historic District.  The depot is now home to the Appomattox Visitor Information Center.

There is a marker at Appomattox Depot that explains the final blow to General Robert E. Lee at the Battle of Appomattox Station, 1865:

References

External links 
 
 The Battle of Appomattox Station
 Civil War photo of Appomattox Station in April 1865

Norfolk and Western Railway stations
Historic district contributing properties in Virginia
Railway stations on the National Register of Historic Places in Virginia
National Register of Historic Places in Appomattox County, Virginia
Railway stations in the United States opened in 1923